Viola nephrophylla (northern bog violet, Leconte violet, or kidney leaved violet) syn. Viola nephrophylla Greene f. albinea (Farw.), Viola pratincola Greene, Viola retusa Greene ) is an annual or perennial forb in the Violet family (Violaceae) native to North America.

Viola nephrophylla was named by Edward Lee Greene in 1896 from specimens he collected near Montrose, Colorado.  The species name, nephrophylla, is from the Greek for "kidney shaped leaves".

Its habitats include moist meadows and open woods.

Conservation status within the United States
It is listed  endangered in Massachusetts, New York, and Ohio, as threatened in New Hampshire, and as a special concern in Connecticut.

Native American ethnobotany

The Ramah Navajo use the plant as a ceremonial emetic.

References

nephrophylla
Plants described in 1896
Flora of Subarctic America
Plants used in traditional Native American medicine
Flora of Western Canada
Flora of Eastern Canada
Flora of the Northeastern United States
Flora of the North-Central United States
Flora of the South-Central United States
Flora of the Northwestern United States
Flora of the Southwestern United States
Flora of Arkansas
Flora without expected TNC conservation status